Scullya is an extinct genus of titanosuchian therapsids. It is known from a poorly preserved snout that shows no clear titanosuchian characters. The presence of teeth on the palate may be an anteosaurian character. It is considered an indeterminable specimen.

See also

 List of therapsids

References

Tapinocephalians
Prehistoric therapsid genera
Permian synapsids of Africa
Fossil taxa described in 1929
Taxa named by Robert Broom